Ivan Mykhaylovych Bobko (born 10 December 1990) is a Ukrainian professional footballer who plays as a left midfielder for Karpaty Lviv.

Career

Early years
Bobko is product of youth team systems of Dyussh 11 Odesa. His first trainer was A. Kucherevskyi.

Karpaty Lviv
On 5 January 2023 he moved to Karpaty Lviv.

Career statistics

Club

Honours
LNZ Cherkasy
 Ukrainian Amateur Cup: 2020–21

Chornomorets
 Ukrainian First League runners-up: 2010–11
 Ukrainian Cup runners-up: 2012–13
 Ukrainian Super Cup runners-up: 2013

References

External links
 
 

1990 births
Living people
Footballers from Odesa
Ukrainian footballers
FC Chornomorets Odesa players
FC Chornomorets-2 Odesa players
FC Metalist Kharkiv players
Debreceni VSC players
AFC Eskilstuna players
FC Okzhetpes players
FC Torpedo Kutaisi players
FC Sfîntul Gheorghe players
FC LNZ Cherkasy players
Ukrainian Premier League players
Ukrainian First League players
Ukrainian Second League players
Ukrainian Amateur Football Championship players
Nemzeti Bajnokság I players
Allsvenskan players
Kazakhstan Premier League players
Erovnuli Liga players
Ukrainian expatriate footballers
Expatriate footballers in Hungary
Expatriate footballers in Sweden
Expatriate footballers in Kazakhstan
Expatriate footballers in Georgia (country)
Expatriate footballers in Moldova
Ukrainian expatriate sportspeople in Hungary
Ukrainian expatriate sportspeople in Sweden
Ukrainian expatriate sportspeople in Kazakhstan
Ukrainian expatriate sportspeople in Georgia (country)
Ukrainian expatriate sportspeople in Moldova
Association football midfielders
Ukraine youth international footballers